ACTS Academy of Higher Education is an educational institution in Bangalore, India, which provides education through regular and distance-education mode. ACTS is an acronym for Arts, Crafts, Trade, and Studies. The Academy was founded by Ken Gnanakan, a well known Christian theologian from India who served as General Secretary of Asia Theological Association for several years. ACTS has also founded the William Carey University in Shillong, Meghalaya.

External links
William Carey University, http://www.actswcu.org/ 
ACTS Group, http://www.actsgroup.org/
Asia Theological Association, http://www.ataasia.com

Colleges in Bangalore